Benon Biraaro (1 March 1958 – 12 February 2020; surname sometimes spelled Biraro) was a Ugandan military officer and a high-ranking commander in the Uganda People's Defence Force (UPDF). While still in the active military, he served as the commandant of the Uganda Senior Command and Staff College in Kimaka, Jinja. In 2016, he ran (unsuccessfully) for President of Uganda on behalf of his agrarian Farmers Party of Uganda.

Background and formal education
Benon Biraaro was born on 1 March 1958 in Isingiro District. He attended Makerere University, in Kampala, Uganda's oldest and largest public university, graduating in 1982 with a Bachelor of Arts in political science. Later, he attended Cranfield University in the United Kingdom, graduating with a  Masters in Global Strategic Studies.

Military education
His military education included the following courses:
 Officer Cadet Course
 Junior Staff College in the United Kingdom
 Junior Command and Staff College at the Nigerian Defence Academy, in Kaduna, Nigeria
 Senior Command and Staff College at Fort Leavenworth, Kansas, USA
 Africa Strategic Studies Course at Nasser Military Academy, Cairo, Egypt
 Masters in Global Security Studies at Cranfield University, United Kingdom

Military career
Benon Biraaro joined the Ugandan Bush War on 7 June 1982, straight out of Makerere University. By 1984, he had risen to the position of secretary to the High Command and National Resistance Council. By 1986, he was the deputy to Yoweri Museveni’s Principal Private Secretary. He was then posted to Kitgum District, as the special district administrator from 1986 until 1987. He then was transferred to Kyankwanzi and served as deputy commandant of the National Leadership Institute. Next, he served as the commanding officer of the 97th Battalion in Uganda's Eastern Region, which ended the insurgency in the Teso sub-region and in Tororo and Busia Districts. Following that, he served as the commander of the military police in Uganda. He was then appointed the military representative in the Office of the Inspector General of Government. He then served as a member of the Adhoc Committee on Human Rights under the chairmanship of Abu Mayanja. He then became the director of training in the UPDF.

In 1998, he commanded the Ugandan contingent to the Democratic Republic of the Congo (DRC). He then became the commander of the Infantry Division in the Western Region of Uganda. Following that he was appointed deputy chief of staff of the UPDF (DCOS), the fifth-highest rank in the Uganda military. Next, he served as the commandant for two in-takes at the Uganda Senior Command and Staff College at Kimaka in the Eastern Region. He then served as the chief of the Strategic Planning and Management Unit of the Peace and Security Council at the African Union headquarters in Addis Ababa, Ethiopia.

Other responsibilities
Biraaro and several prominent individuals in the Ugandan military and business started a public-private-partnership with the aim of raising investment funds locally to invest in local infrastructure and industry. Biraaro was the founder president and lead investor in Local Investment for Transformation.

Personal details
General Biraaro was a married father. He was of the Christian faith. He was reported to have built a church in the village where he was born, in Isingiro District.

He died on the morning of 12 February 2020, at Kampala Hospital, located on Kololo Hill, in Kampala, where he had been admitted six days before. He was reported to have died from colon cancer. He was just 61 years old.

See also
 Ivan Koreta
 Aronda Nyakairima
 Isingiro District

References

External links
  General Biraaro Plans To Run For President of Uganda In 2016

1958 births
2020 deaths
People from Isingiro District
Alumni of Cranfield University
Ugandan military personnel
Makerere University alumni
People from Western Region, Uganda
Ugandan generals